The Waterloo-Cedar Falls Courier is a daily afternoon newspaper published by Lee Enterprises for people living in Waterloo and Cedar Falls, Iowa as well as northeast Iowa.

The first issue of The Waterloo-Cedar Falls Courier was published on November 22, 1859, by WH Hartman and George Ingersoll. The Courier changed to a daily newspaper in 1890, publishing in the afternoon every day except Saturday.

Howard Publications bought the Waterloo Courier and Cedar Falls Record in 1983.  At that time, the Courier had been owned for 128 years by the same family, and had a daily circulation of around 55,000 in 1983.  The circulation of The Record was about 4,000.   Lee Enterprises acquired the Howard chain in 2002.

References

External links
 Waterloo-Cedar Falls Courier Web Site
 Lee Enterprises profile of The Courier

Newspapers published in Iowa
Lee Enterprises publications
Waterloo, Iowa
Newspapers established in 1859
Cedar Falls, Iowa
1859 establishments in Iowa